Thalner is an Shirpur Tahsil's Village, the first capital of the Faruqi kings, stands on the banks of the Tapi river, in Shirpur tehsil about 46.67 km. (28 miles) north-east of Dhule in Maharashtra state, India. It was fortified and played a significant role in the history of Khandesh. At the foot of the fort is an old stone temple dedicated to Thaleshwar. The name Thalner probably derived from this temple. The capital was once a significant commercial centre.

Thalner fort

The fort had one side rising out of the Tapi and the three other sides were surrounded by a hollow way, varying in width from 91.44 to 137.16 metres (100 to 150 yards). The walls rose to the height of about 18.28 metres (60 ft.) above this hollow and the interior had the same elevation. The only entrance was on the eastern side, secured by five successive gates communicating by intricate traverses, whose enclosure gradually rose to the height of the main wall. A winding ramp, interspersed in some places with steps, ascended through the gate into the terreplein of the rampart. Great ingenuity had been exercised to make this part as strong as possible, apparently under the idea that the profile of the rest rendered it secure, notwithstanding the absence of a ditch.

Today only a small portion of the walls that were on the river side is standing, the others having collapsed for the most part. Even of this wall one of the bastions was ruined by the great floods of the Tapi which took place in 1876, and a tunnel opened in which a small, well executed idol of Vishnu was found.

Situated on the banks of the Tapi and the foot of the fort is an old stone built temple dedicated to Thaleshwar. Its 1.828 X 1.828 metre vestibule contains a small ling symbol. It is crowned by a 7.62 metre (25 ft.) high shikhar.

History
According to a local grant, in 1128, while the country for 32.18 km (20 miles) around was ' without a light', and twenty-seven of its forts were deserted, Thalner prospered under Javaji and Govaji of the Tale sub-division of Gavali rajas or the Abhira kings. At that time, Daulatrao, son of Bajirao of Daulatabad came to the people of Khandesh, and finding Thalner flourishing established Javaji's family as headmen of the town.

In 1370, when Firozshah Tughluq (1351–1388) granted Malik Raja Faruqi an estate on the south border of Gujarat, Malik chose Thalner as his headquarters. In 1371, defeated by the Gujarat king, Malik was forced to take refuge in Thalner fort. On his death in 1399 Malik left Thalner to his second son Iftikar Khan. But in 1417 with the aid of the Sultan of Malwa, Nasir Khan, the elder son, wrested it from his brother. In 1498 Thalner was invaded by Mahmud Begada, king of Gujarat, whose army laid waste the district and would not retire till arrears of tribute were paid.  In 1511 Mahmud Begada granted Thalner with about one-half of Khandesh to Malik Hissamuddin, a noble of his court. But in the next year, Hissamuddin was murdered and Thalner was restored to Khandesh.  In 1566 it was the scene of the defeat of the Khandesh king Miran Muhammad Shah II by Changiz Khan of Gujarat.  In 1600, when it passed to Emperor Akbar, Thalner was noticed as being of great strength though in a plain.  In 1660 Tavernier mentioned it as one of the places of trade on the Surat and Burhanpur line.

In 1750 it was a strong fort, the centre of thirty-two little governments.  Shortly after this, it passed to the Peshwa, and was by him made over to Holkar, who, around 1800, pledged it to the Nimbalkars. It was recovered the following year and kept by the Holkar family until in 1818, under the terms of the Mandesar treaty, it was handed over to the British.

Battle of Thalner, 1818

Sindva was a place with a much greater name for strength in the Khandesh region, but it surrendered to the British at once, hence no resistance was expected at Thalner. However, its capture proved one of the bloodiest incidents in the conquest of Khandesh.

Present condition

The fort of Thalner is in a dilapidated condition. Besides the tombs of Major MacGregor and Captain Gordon, the chief objects of interest are ten Muhammedan domed tombs of common country black stone and two of burnt brick. Of the whole number, one is eight cornered and the rest are square. They vary in size from eleven feet by eleven to three and a half feet square. Though more or less damaged outwardly and with the inside part of their domes partly destroyed, they are in good order. The eight-cornered tomb has some Arabic writing, but so worn as to be unreadable.

Tourist attractions

In Thalner there are two temples, one dedicated to Mahadeva and the other to Khandoba's Temple. The Mahadeva temple is located at Tapi riverside, and Khandoba temple is located near the Thalner bus stand.

Notable personalities
Lata Mangeshkar's mother, affectionately called 'Mai', was from Thalner. She was the daughter of Seth Haridas Ramdas Lad, a prosperous businessman of the town.

References

Villages in Dhule district
Forts in Maharashtra
Former capital cities in India
Tourist attractions in Dhule district
Ahir history